Nathaniel Bishop Collins House is a historic home located at Berkshire in Tioga County, New York. It is a two-story, five-bay center hall, Federal style house built of brick above a stone foundation.  The house was built about 1830. Also on the property is a contributing mid-19th-century carriage barn, a lean-to shed, and an early 20th-century chicken house.

It was listed on the National Register of Historic Places in 1984.

References

Houses on the National Register of Historic Places in New York (state)
Federal architecture in New York (state)
Houses completed in 1830
Houses in Tioga County, New York
1830 establishments in New York (state)
National Register of Historic Places in Tioga County, New York